The timeline of children's rights in the United Kingdom includes a variety of events that are both political and grassroots in nature.

The UK government maintains a position that the United Nations Convention on the Rights of the Child (UNCRC) is not legally enforceable and is hence 'aspirational' only, although a 2003 ECHR ruling states that, "The human rights of children and the standards to which all governments must aspire in realising these rights for all children are set out in the Convention on the Rights of the Child." Eighteen years after ratification, the four Children's Commissioners in the UK (including those for the three devolved administrations) have united in calling for adoption of the Convention into domestic legislation, making children's rights recognised and legally binding.

Opponents of children's rights often raise the objection that rights must entail responsibilities. The children's rights movement asserts rather that children have rights which adults, states and the government have a responsibility to uphold. Overall, a 2008 report stated that there had been no improvement in children's rights in the UK since 2002. Warning that there is a "widely held fear of children and young people" in the UK, the report says: "The incessant portrayal of children as thugs and yobs" not only reinforces the fears of the public but also influences policy and legislation." The report does not address the question of the degree to which the fear of uncontrolled children in the UK is justified.

The UNCRC defines children, for the purposes of the Convention, as persons under the age 18, unless domestic legislation provides otherwise. In that spirit, this timeline includes as children all those below the UK age of majority, which was 21 until 1970 when it was reduced to 18. Although the Crown Dependencies of the Isle of Man, Guernsey and Jersey are not constitutionally part of the UK, the British government is responsible for their external affairs and therefore for their international treaty obligations, so this timeline includes references to matters in those dependencies.

Pre-19th century

19th century

20th century

21st century

See also
 List of children's rights topics
 List of Acts of Parliament
 List of youth rights topics
 Student rights
 Timeline of children's rights in the United States
 Youth rights

References

Graham, Dr. Olga. (2009) Autism: The Teratogen Fallout. Toronto: Free Press 777. Rights are needed for children with autism regarding training and educating using visual methodology, proper diagnosis and treatment etc. Rights of children to a non-hazardous environment has become urgent. http://autismfallout.com

External links
 Child Advocacy Documents - Worldwide
 Peter Higginbotham's history of the workhouse
 Andrew Roberts' Mental Health History Timeline
 International Legal Standards for Children's Rights

 
Child care
History of youth
British history timelines
Youth in the United Kingdom